The murder of Jasmine Fiore occurred on August 15, 2009. Fiore was a model from Santa Cruz, California, United States. Her body was discovered on August 15, 2009, after having been strangled and stuffed into a suitcase. Her remains had been mutilated to prevent recognition; she was eventually identified by the serial numbers of her breast implants. Fiore was 28 years old at the time of her death.

Her husband, a former reality TV contestant, Ryan Alexander Jenkins, was the only suspect, and was formally charged with the murder. On August 23, 2009, Jenkins was found dead in a hotel room in Hope, British Columbia, Canada, after committing suicide. He was 32 years old.

Fiore's background
Fiore was born Jasmine Lepore in 1981. Her parents divorced when she was eight years old, and she was raised by her mother, Lisa Lepore, in Bonny Doon, California. In her youth, she enjoyed playing football, and worked for a local grocery store.

Fiore was a swimsuit model who frequently worked as a body-painted model at parties for entertainment. She appeared in shows at Las Vegas casinos. Fiore had acted in commercials for adult phone lines and bathing suits.  Fiore had also obtained a real-estate license, and was planning to open a gym and personal training center.

According to Fiore's friend of a year-and-a-half, Marta Montoya, Fiore had a longstanding but intermittently serious relationship with Robert Hasman, with whom Fiore wanted to settle down. According to People magazine, another suitor of Fiore's was Travis Heinrich, whom she met around 2005. Heinrich and Fiore had become engaged, and remained so for less than half a year in 2006 or 2007; although the couple broke off this engagement, they continued to date.

Marriage
Fiore met real estate investor Ryan Jenkins at a Las Vegas casino shortly after Jenkins completed filming Megan Wants a Millionaire. Two days later – March 18, 2009 – the pair married at A Little White Wedding Chapel on the Las Vegas Strip. According to court records, Jenkins was charged in June 2009 in Clark County, Nevada, with "battery constituting domestic violence" for hitting Fiore on the arm. Travis Heinrich, who was present, said Jenkins and Fiore were arguing over her kissing Heinrich, and Jenkins hit Fiore's arm, causing her to fall into a nearby swimming pool. Jenkins was to go on trial in December. The pair reconciled shortly before Fiore's death, and were reportedly traveling to San Diego for a poker game.

Lisa Lepore, Fiore's mother, claims that the two fought frequently, and that Jenkins was jealous of Fiore's friendships with her ex-boyfriends. Dan Jenkins, Ryan Jenkins' father, said that Fiore was his son's only friend in California, and that she would disappear for days at a time and lie about it to his son. In addition, Lepore told The Associated Press that her daughter had her marriage to Jenkins annulled in May 2009, but there are no court records of an annulment in either Nevada, where the couple had married, or Los Angeles County, where they last lived.

Fiore's death
Investigators reported that Jenkins and Fiore checked into the L'Auberge hotel in Del Mar, San Diego, on the evening of August 13, 2009. They were to attend a poker tournament, a charity fundraiser for the Carma Foundation at the Del Mar Hilton. Surveillance video captured Fiore and Jenkins leaving the Hilton at about 2:30 a.m. on August 14. The couple were later seen at the Ivy Hotel, a nightclub in downtown San Diego. At around 4:30 a.m., Jenkins returned to the L'Auberge hotel alone. Fiore was not seen alive again. Jenkins left the L'Auberge hotel at around 9 a.m. that day.

Fiore's body was discovered, but not identified, on August 15 at about 7 a.m., badly beaten and crushed inside a suitcase, in a dumpster in an alley in Buena Park, California. According to Buena Park police, Fiore's teeth and fingers had been removed, before her nude body was stuffed into the suitcase. She had also been strangled. Authorities believe the mutilation was an attempt to impede identification. On August 18, her remains were identified using the serial numbers of her breast implants. The Orange County coroner's office reported Fiore had died a couple of hours before her body was found. Fiore's white Mercedes was found abandoned in a parking lot in West Hollywood, about a mile from the penthouse Fiore shared with Jenkins in Fairfax District, Los Angeles. Police reported that there was a significant amount of blood, and some evidence of hair pulling.

Jenkins reported Fiore missing on August 15 at 8:55 p.m. He told police that he last saw Fiore about 8:30 p.m. August 14 at their home on Edinburgh Avenue, Los Angeles. Jenkins said they had gone to San Diego for a poker event and that after returning, she dropped him off that evening, left to do errands, and never returned.

Jenkins' movements after Fiore's death
At around 9 a.m. on August 16, 2009, the day after reporting Fiore missing and after spending some time packing, Jenkins was seen leaving their penthouse for the last time. Police said he then left Los Angeles, and went to Nevada to pick up his speedboat. On August 17, when contacted by police, Jenkins said he was in Utah, and was headed to Canada to resolve some immigration issues. On August 18, Fiore's body was identified, and the murder was first reported. On the afternoon of August 19, Jenkins called his father from Birch Bay, who informed him that Fiore had been found murdered.

The Whatcom County Sheriff's Department received witness reports of Jenkins' black BMW SUV towing a boat toward the Canada–US border. Police later found the BMW SUV and an empty boat trailer at a marina in Blaine, Washington; the engine was still warm. At the time Jenkins was only a person of interest in the investigation. He had not been charged, but Canadian authorities had been alerted to watch for him. U.S. Coast Guard and U.S. Customs and Border Protection (CBP) confirmed they had boats patrolling northwest Washington waters looking for Jenkins as early as August 19. Initial media reports were that the US Coast Guard and Canadian authorities chased Jenkins' speedboat as it crossed to Point Roberts, but officials later denied these reports.

On August 19, a man matching Jenkins' description was seen piloting his boat into a marina in Point Roberts, where Jenkins' stepmother lives. The Royal Canadian Mounted Police (RCMP) announced that they believed Jenkins crossed into Canada sometime between August 19 and August 20.

On August 20, Jenkins was charged with Fiore's murder, and an arrest warrant was issued. The same day, Jenkins called his detained father at the airport, but his father had to hang up the call.

Jenkins' suicide
At about 6 p.m. on August 20, Jenkins arrived in a silver PT Cruiser with a young blonde woman at the Thunderbird Motel in Hope, British Columbia, Canada. The car had Alberta license plates. They pulled up beside a dumpster, rather than beside the rooms, which the motel manager said was strange. Jenkins stayed in the car while a young woman paid cash for three nights' accommodation. The manager described the woman as attractive, about 25 to 30 years old, and very calm, making small talk while registering. The guest in the room next door said the woman stayed for about 20 minutes with Jenkins in Room 2, and then left the motel. The woman proved to be Jenkins's half-sister, Alena Jenkins. The manager saw Jenkins walking outside the motel the next day, August 21. The manager said Jenkins looked "exhausted", and was not recognizable from his picture on television.

At 11:30 a.m. on August 23, the couple failed to check out. Having noticed very little activity over the weekend, the motel manager and his nephew decided to check on the room. Jenkins was found dead, apparently of suicide; his body was hanging from a clothes rack by a belt. No suicide note was found at the motel; however, police found a document saved on Jenkins' computer titled, "Last Will and Testament", which was dated August 20, 2009.

On August 27, 2009, investigators found a storage unit full of Jenkins' belongings, including a suitcase of clothes, in Washington state.

Reaction by VH1
Following the announcement that Jenkins was connected with the murder of Fiore, VH1 put Megan Wants a Millionaire on indefinite hiatus, out of respect for Fiore's family. It also deleted the show's page from the official VH1 website, and dropped reruns of past shows from its schedule. It removed the show's archived episodes from the iTunes Store and cable video on demand services, leading to speculation that the show would never air again. It subsequently emerged that Jenkins had not only been charged with assaulting Fiore, but had been convicted two years earlier for assaulting a woman in Calgary. The latter incident had not been disclosed to either VH1 or Megan Wants a Millionaire producer 51 Minds. In a statement, 51 Minds said that it would not have allowed Jenkins on the show, had it known about the 2007 incident.

VH1 had hired Collective Intelligence, a private investigation firm, to perform background checks on Jenkins and the other contestants. Collective Intelligence doesn't perform background checks outside the United States, and outsourced the vetting of Jenkins to a Canadian firm, Straightline International. In 2009, Collective Intelligence sued Straightline for breach of contract. The suit alleged that Straightline had falsely told Collective Intelligence that Jenkins' record was clean, and had also failed to check Jenkins against the RCMP criminal database. Collective Intelligence claimed to have lost valuable business from Viacom (owner of VH1), NBC, and ABC as a result of the damage to its reputation. Collective Intelligence won their lawsuit in July 2011.

The day after Jenkins' death, VH1 officially announced the show was cancelled, and that it would not run the third season of I Love Money, which Jenkins won.

References

External links
  (Associated Press video)
 Murder warrant filed against Ryan Jenkins

2009 murders in the United States
Female models from California
American murder victims
People murdered in California
2009 in California
August 2009 crimes in the United States
Deaths by person in California
Deaths by beating in the United States
Deaths by strangulation in the United States
Suicides in British Columbia
History of women in California